Kim Tae-seong (born 27 October 1993) is a South Korean footballer who plays as a midfielder.

Career

Professional
Taeseong signed with United Soccer League side Colorado Springs Switchbacks on 21 March 2016. He last played for Colorado Springs in 2018.

References

External links
 

1993 births
Living people
South Korean footballers
South Korean expatriate footballers
Colorado Springs Switchbacks FC players
Association football midfielders
Expatriate soccer players in the United States
USL Championship players